Louisa Young is a British novelist, songwriter, short-story writer, biographer and journalist, whose work has appeared in 32 languages. By 2023 she had published seven novels under her own name and five with her daughter, the actor Isabel Adomakoh Young, under the pen name Zizou Corder. Her eleventh novel, Devotion, appeared in June 2016. She has also written three non-fiction books, The Book of the Heart (Flamingo, 2000) and A Great Task of Happiness (Macmillan, 1995; Lulu, 2012). Her memoir, You Left Early: A True Story of Love and Alcohol (Borough Press, 2018), is an account of her relationship with the composer Robert Lockhart and of his alcoholism. Her most recent novel, Twelve Months and a Day, was published in June 2022 (Borough Press) in the UK, and in the US in January 2023 (Putnam). She is currently working on a Musical Theatre adaptation.

Prizes
Young's work has been nominated and shortlisted for prizes that include the Orange Prize for Fiction, the Costa Book of the Year, the Costa Novel of the Year, the Galaxy Audiobook of the Year Prize, which it won, the Booktrust Teenage Prize, the Carnegie Medal, the International Dublin Literary Award, the Wellcome Book Prize and the Folio Prize. It has been chosen by the Richard and Judy Book Club.

Early life
Louisa Young was born in London, England, her father being the politician and writer Wayland Young (Lord Kennet), and her mother Elizabeth Young, Lady Kennet. She has five siblings, including the sculptor Emily Young.

Young was educated at Paddington's Hallfield Primary School, St Paul's Girls' School, Westminster School and Trinity College, Cambridge, where she read history.

Career
Young worked as a sub-editor, then as a freelance columnist and feature writer on national publications, including the Guardian, the Sunday Times, the Daily Express, Marie Claire, Tatler, Bike Magazine and Motorcycle International. She also worked at various stages as a despatch rider, a busker (double bass and vocals), a waitress, a kitchen-hand and a shop assistant.

Her first book, A Great Task of Happiness, was a biography of her grandmother Kathleen Scott, widow of Captain Scott of the Antarctic, published by Macmillan in 1995. Then came three novels set in London and Egypt: Baby Love, Desiring Cairo and Tree of Pearls (Flamingo). Baby Love was listed for the Orange Prize for Fiction. These were followed in 2002 by The Book of the Heart, a cultural history of the heart as it is seen through art, religion, love and anatomy. In 2007 she was a curatorial advisor for the Wellcome Foundation exhibition The Heart, which was inspired by her book.

She co-authored five books for children with her daughter: Lionboy, Lionboy: The Chase, Lionboy: The Truth, Lee Raven, Boy Thief, and Halo. The Lionboy trilogy was translated into 36 languages. Halo was shortlisted for the Booktrust Teenage Prize in 2010, and nominated for the Carnegie Medal in 2011. The film rights to Lionboy have been sold three times, including twice to Steven Spielberg's DreamWorks.  A stage production by Théâtre de Complicité was directed by Annabel Arden, adapted by Marcelo dos Santos with Arden, Young and the company, and starred Adetomiwa Edun. It opened in 2013 at the Bristol Old Vic and toured the UK to favourable reviews. It was reprised at the Tricycle Theatre, London, the New Victory Theatre, New York, and in Hong Kong and South Korea in 2014/2015.

In 2011, she published My Dear, I Wanted to Tell You, a First World War novel shortlisted for the Costa Novel of the Year Award and the Wellcome Book Prize, which won the Galaxy Audiobook of the Year Award 2012, read by actor Dan Stevens and with music by Robert Lockhart. It was chosen for the Richard & Judy Book Club in 2012; nominated for the International Dublin Literary Award 2013, and was BBC Radio Four's Book at Bedtime in January 2012, read by Olivia Colman. It was the London Cityread choice for 2014 and has been sold in 15 languages. The Heroes' Welcome, a sequel, was published in the UK in 2014 and nominated for the Folio Prize that year. Devotion, the third book in the series, was published in June 2016.  

She has contributed to various anthologies, including I Am Heathcliff (ed. Kate Mosse), Underground; Tales for London (ed. Ann Bissell) and A Love Letter to Europe (Coronet).

Young's memoir You Left Early: A True Story of Love and Alcohol (Borough Press, 2018), covers her relationship with Robert Lockhart and difficult issues of addiction, talent, love and death.

Her novel "Twelve Months and a Day" was published in the Uk by Borough Press in June 2022, and by Putnam in the US in January 2023, when it was People Magazine's Book of the Week 

Young's music project "Birds of Britain" is a collaboration with multi-instrumentalist, arranger and producer Alex Mackenzie. The debut album You Left Early (June 2018) is a collection of songs written by Young about the death of her fiancé.

Works
Fiction
Egypt trilogy
Baby Love (London: Flamingo, 1997; Borough Press, 2015)
Desiring Cairo (Flamingo, 1999; Borough Press, 2015)
Tree of Pearls (Flamingo, 2000, Borough Press, 2015)
My Dear, I Wanted to Tell You (HarperCollins, March 2011; Paperback: January 2012; US 2011)
The Heroes' Welcome (Borough Press, May 2014)
Devotion (Borough Press, June 2016)
Twelve Months and a Day (Borough Press, June 2022; Putnam 2023)

Non-fiction
A Great Task of Happiness: The Life of Kathleen Scott (Macmillan, 1995); reissued by The Hydraulic Press, Lulu, 2012
The Book of the Heart (Flamingo, 2002)
You Left Early: A True Story of Love and Alcohol (Borough Press, April 2018)

Radio
Ruby Baby radio drama, BBC Radio 7, 2010
She wiped the surface and put the kettle on, BBC Radio 4, read by Emma Fielding, 2012

By Zizou Corder
Zizou Corder is the joint pseudonym of mother-and-daughter co-authors Louisa and Isabel Adomakoh Young.
Lionboy (Puffin, 2003)
Lionboy: The Chase (Puffin, 2003)
Lionboy: The Truth (Puffin, 2005)
Lee Raven, Boy Thief (Puffin, 2007)
Halo (Puffin, 2009)
"The Intrepid Dumpling's Dugong Story", in The Just When Stories (Beautiful Books, 2010)

References

External links

Young, Louisa, "Alone with the Man in Black", The Guardian, 17 September 2003
Young, Louisa, "We are all the New JK Rowling now", The Guardian, 4 August 2003

21st-century English novelists
21st-century English women writers
21st-century pseudonymous writers
Daughters of barons
English children's writers
English women novelists
Living people
Pseudonymous women writers
Writers from London
Year of birth missing (living people)